Events in the year 1990 in Gabon.

Incumbents 

 President: Omar Bongo Ondimba
 Prime Minister: Léon Mébiame (until 3 May), Casimir Oyé-Mba (from 3 May)

Events 

 Opposition parties are made legal.

Deaths

References 

 
1990s in Gabon
Years of the 20th century in Gabon
Gabon